Damião de Góis (February 2, 1502January 30, 1574), born in Alenquer, Portugal, was an important Portuguese humanist philosopher. He was a friend and student of Erasmus. He was appointed secretary to the Portuguese factory in Antwerp in 1523 by King John III of Portugal. He compiled one of the first accounts on Ethiopian Christianity.

Biography
Góis (originally spelled as Goes) was born in Alenquer, Portugal, into a noble family who served the Portuguese kings. His father, Rui Dias de Góis was a valet to Duke of Aveiro, and his mother was Isabel Gomes de Limi, a descendant of Flemish merchants who established themselves in Portugal. Damião's patrilineal great-grandfather, Gomes Dias de Góis, had been in the entourage of Prince Henry the Navigator. 

Around 1518, Góis joined the court of King Manuel I of Portugal. Under Manuel I’s successor, King John III of Portugal, in 1523, he was sent to Antwerp, as secretary and treasurer of the Portuguese feitoria (factory, trading post and commercial office). Henceforth, Góis travelled intensely (Poland, Lithuania, Denmark, Germany, Sweden, France, England, Italy), entering into contact with a number of important figures, like Sebastian Münster, Erasmus (who hosted him in Freiburg), Giovanni Battista Ramusio, Philipp Melanchthon, Thomas More and Martin Luther. Among the many Portuguese acquaintances, Góis was friend of the writers João de Barros and André de Resende. A humanist and an open mind, Góis followed courses at the Universities of Padua and Leuven, wrote on various topics, like the condition of the Sami people ("Lapps"), and translated some classic works – among them, Cicero’s Cato maior de senectute – into Portuguese. He was also a composer of some musical pieces and kept a private collection of paintings.

Góis translated into Latin a Portuguese opuscle on the Ethiopian embassy of the Armenian Mateus (the representative of the Negus Dawit II) to Portugal (1532), which also included the famous "Letter of Prester John" written by the Ethiopian Queen Eleni (1509) and a "Confessio illorum fidei".

In 1538 he published a translation of the Biblical book Ecclesiastes in Portuguese, though it was not widely circulated.  In the same year, he took a Dutch wife, Joana van Hargen (known as Joana de Argem in Portugal), daughter of a Flemish councilman to the Court of Carlos V. In 1540, he published the famous Fides, religio, moresque Aethiopum ("Ethiopian faith, religion, and mores"). The book received a widespread diffusion in Europe, in both Catholic and Protestant circles, and enjoyed of successive editions (Paris 1541, Leuven 1544, Leiden 1561, Cologne 1574). 
It also earned the author, however, the criticisms of the powerful Portuguese Cardinal Henry of Portugal, who, as Grand Inquisitor of the Portuguese Inquisition, banned its circulation in the kingdom. The Jesuit order proved equally critical, as he was accused by the Provincial superior Simão Rodrigues of Lutheranism, and of being a disciple of Erasmus, before the Inquisition.

He was settled at Louvain, then the literary centre of the Low Countries, when the French besieged the town in 1542. He was given the command of the defending forces, and saved Louvain, but was taken prisoner and confined for nine months in France, till he obtained his freedom by a heavy ransom. He was rewarded, however, by a grant of arms from Charles V. He finally returned to Portugal in 1545, with a view of becoming tutor to the king's son, but he failed to obtain this post, owing to the accusations before the Inquisition.

In 1548, Góis was named Guarda-Mor (High Guardian) of the Torre do Tombo (Royal Archives) and ten years later was entrusted by the same Cardinal Henry to write the chronicle of Manuel I’s reign. The task has been previously confided to de Barros, but relinquished by him. The work was completed in some seven years and became his major achievement; nonetheless it was widely attacked and parts of it were significantly censored. He also published a description of the city of Lisbon – Urbis Olisiponis Descriptio (1554).

In 1570 the inquisitorial process opened again, sending Góis to reclusion in the monastery of Batalha. He died shortly after in Alenquer under mysterious circumstances (apparently, murder), free but sick, and was buried in the church of Nossa Senhora da Várzea. Góis had several children: Manuel in 1540, Ambrósio in 1541, Rui Dias de Góis, António de Góis, Catarina de Góis, and Maria de Góis.

Chamber operas
 "Melodias estranhas", chamber opera by António Chagas Rosa on a libretto by Gerrit Komrij. 2001.

Writings
]
 Legatio Magni Indorum Imperatoris Presbyteri Ioannis ... (Antwerp 1532; new ed. in: Elizabeth B. Blackburn, “The Legacy of ‘Prester John’”, Moreana 4, 1967, 37–98)
 Ecclesiastes de Salamam, com algũas annotações neçessarias (Venezia, 1538; new ed. by T. F. Earle, O Livro de Ecclesiastes, Lisboa, 2002)
 Livro de Marco Tullio Ciçeram chamado Catam maior, ou da velhiçe, dedicado a Tito Pomponio Attico (Venezia, 1538)
 Fides, religio, moresque Aethiopum ... (Lovanii 1540; Parisiis ²1541; German tr. Wiesbaden 1999)
 Deploratio Lappianae gentis (Lovanii 1540)
 Urbis Olisiponis descriptio (Évora, 1554; Frankfurt, 1603; Coimbra, 1791; Eng. tr. New York, 1996) 
 Crónica do Felicíssimo Rei D. Manuel (Lisboa 1566–67; ²1619; Coimbra 1926)
 Crónica do Principe D. João (Lisboa, 1567; new ed. by Graça Almeida Rodrigues, Lisboa, 1977)
 As cartas Latinas de Damião de Góis, ed. by Amadeu Torres, in Noese e crise na epistolografia Latina goisiana (Paris, 1982)

References

Notes

Further reading
 Damião de Góis, Lisbon in the Renaissance. A New Translation of the Urbis Olisiponis Descriptio by Jeffey S. Ruth (New York: 1996)
 Jean Aubin, “Damião de Góis dans une Europe Évangelique”, in: Id., Le Latin et l’astrolabe, Lisboa – Paris 1996, 211–35
 Jeremy Lawrance, “The Middle Indies: Damião de Góis on Preseter John and the Ethiopians”, Renaissance Studies, 6 (1992), 306-24
 Damião de Góis: humaniste européen, ed. by J. V. de Pina Martins (Braga, 1982)
 Marcel Bataillon, “Le cosmopolitisme de Damião de Góis”, in: Id., Etudes sur le Portugal au temps de l’humanisme, Coimbra 1952, 149–96
 “Góis, Damião de”, in: Grande enciclopédia Portuguesa e Brasileira'', Lisboa – Rio de Janeiro 1935–60, 494–97.

External links
 Damião de Góis by Orlando Neves
 

1502 births
1574 deaths
16th-century Portuguese historians
Portuguese chroniclers
Maritime history of Portugal
Portuguese philosophers
Portuguese people of Flemish descent
Portuguese Roman Catholics
Portuguese Renaissance humanists
Portuguese Renaissance writers
Translators of the Bible into Portuguese
People from Alenquer
Old University of Leuven alumni
History of Kerala
Portuguese male composers
16th-century Portuguese composers